This is a listing of the horses that finished in either first, second, or third place and the number of starters in the Indiana Oaks, an American Grade 2 race for three-year-old fillies at 1-1/16 miles on synthetic surface held at Hoosier Park in Anderson, Indiana.  (List 1995-present)

References 

Lists of horse racing results